Greenware may refer to:

Greenware or Celadon, Chinese pottery in a range of jade-like green colours 
Greenware (pottery), unfired clay pottery
Greenware (computing), software distributed under the condition that the user does something to help the environment
Greenware, the brand name of a 100% corn based cup produced by Fabri-Kal